Heijin may refer to:

Black gold (politics), a term used in Taiwan to refer to political corruption, especially businesses with organized crime societies
Island of Greed, a 1997 Hong Kong film about Taiwan's "black gold" politics